Pentagon Row is an upscale outdoor shopping and residential center in Arlington, Virginia, United States with storefronts facing South Joyce Street. It is adjacent to the Fashion Centre at Pentagon City.  It is noted as being one of the contributing factors to the failure of the nearby Landmark Mall.
In December 2020 it changed its name to "Westpost" in a rebranding move.

References

External links 

 Pentagon Row
 Pentagon Row Skating
 Pentagon Row rebrands to Westpost

Buildings and structures in Arlington County, Virginia
Apartment buildings in Virginia
Tourist attractions in Arlington County, Virginia
Shopping malls in the Washington metropolitan area
Shopping malls in Virginia
Shopping malls established in 1999
1999 establishments in Virginia